The PRB Sailing Team is primarily focused on offshore round the world sailing and is the longest term sponsor of Vendee Globe competitors. The current team manager François Dubreuil.

Round the World Race Entrants

PRB - The sponsor 
 Year of creation: 1975
 Head office: La Mothe-Achard, Vendée, France
 Chairman of the board: Jean-Jacques Laurent

Business activity :
 coating and flooring products for the building industry - products for façades and decoration (paint, TPC...), for tiling and soft flooring, for masonry; ranges of tiles and reconstituted stone.
 110M turnover in 2006
 5% in export
 3rd biggest producer of façade rendering in France
 16% of the French single-layer façade market (hydraulic binder)
 500 000 tonnes of rendering per year
 No1 independent rendering manufacturer
 Staff at production site: 200 employees
 Number of sales representatives: 83
 13 warehouses nationally
 7 production units on the same site

References

External links 
 
 Old Website PRB Official Website

Sailing teams
IMOCA 60